Spilarctia ummera is a moth in the family Erebidae. It was described by Swinhoe in 1890. It is found in Myanmar.

References

ummera
Moths described in 1890